Stranded is a 2013 American paranormal investigation reality television  series that premiered on the Syfy network February 27, 2013 and is hosted by Josh Gates of Destination Truth. The show is produced by executive producers Brad Kuhlman, Casey Brumels and Josh Gates for Ping Pong Productions, and Jason Blum of Blumhouse Productions, the latter best known for the Paranormal Activity film franchise. The show has been compared to MTV's paranormal competition show Fear.

Format
The show was created by Josh Gates as both a paranormal and psychological experiment. Each episode features a three-person team made up of paranormal enthusiasts and skeptics from various walks of life who spend several days alone together at some of the most allegedly haunted locations in North America. The teams create their own video footage with hand-held night-vision cameras, along with dozens of fixed cameras, that document their reactions to the ever increasing anxiety, paranoia and desolation of being trapped inside a terrifying place. The show concludes with a review of the footage and personal interviews of each member's experience.

Opening Introduction: 

Message (before each episode):

Reception
Mark Perigard of the Boston Herald gave an overall negative review stating, 'Stranded' shows that boredom, isolation and the power of suggestion—along with some careful goosing by off-screen production assistants, no doubt—can produce, ultimately, a horribly predictable show."

TV by the Numbers announced the show with a more positive review stating, "Over the course of the confinement, the subjects contend with increasingly pervasive feelings of fear and desolation, resulting in an experiment that represents a unique combination of psychology and the paranormal."

Episodes

References

External links
 at SyFy.com
Stranded IMDb entry

2010s American reality television series
2013 American television series debuts
2013 American television series endings
English-language television shows
Paranormal reality television series
Syfy original programming